The Joyce Center, formerly the Athletic & Convocation Center, is a 9,149-seat multi-purpose arena in Notre Dame, Indiana just north of South Bend. The arena opened its doors in 1968. It is home to the University of Notre Dame Fighting Irish basketball and volleyball teams.  The main arena, Phillip J. Purcell Pavilion, is located in the southern portion of the facility.  The northern portion housed a hockey rink until October 2011. It is also home to the Castellan Family Fencing Center and Rolfs Aquatic Center (added on in 1985) in the rear of the building.

Location
It is located across a pedestrian arcade from Notre Dame Stadium, and the center's two domes could easily be seen rising above the stadium's east side prior to its expansion.

History
The  building, designed by architects at Ellerbe Architects of Saint Paul, Minnesota, was built in 29 months, and opened the first week of December 1968 as the Athletic & Convocation Center. It was renamed in 1987 to honor the Rev. Edmund P. Joyce, C.S.C., Notre Dame's executive vice president from 1952 to 1987.  Prior to the building of the Joyce Center, the basketball team played in the Notre Dame Fieldhouse, which opened in 1900. The Fighting Irish Hockey team played in the North dome from 1968 to 2011. They moved to the Compton Family Ice Arena in October 2011.
The last hockey game at the Joyce Center was played on October 15, 2011 (Ohio State beat Notre Dame 4-3). ND's Austin Wuthrich scored the last goal at the Joyce Center.

Renovation
 
In the fall of 2006, the university announced major renovation plans for the Joyce Center. In 2009, the south dome, which houses the basketball arena, underwent a $24.6 million renovation and was renamed Purcell Pavilion, after Philip J. Purcell, a Notre Dame alumnus, trustee, and current chair of the athletic affairs committee. Architectural firm HNTB studied the center after the university began considering renovations in 2001 and worked on the project. Phase 1 of the project was completed in October 2009, with its first event, the women's volleyball "Dig Pink" match for Breast Cancer between Notre Dame and Seton Hall, taking place on Halloween. The first basketball game took place the following night as the Fighting Irish men's squad faced Lewis University in an exhibition contest. Due to the renovation, the capacity of Purcell Pavilion at the Joyce Center dropped from 11,418 to 9,149.  A new video scoreboard over center court was installed prior to the 2010–2011 basketball season.

Major upsets
Notre Dame has a rich tradition of ending winning streaks at the Joyce Center, with victories over eventual national champions, defending NCAA titlists, and number-one-ranked teams. Some of the notable streaks the Irish have ended include:
In 1971, the Irish gave UCLA its only loss of the season.
3 years later, after UCLA had won 88 straight games since the 1971 ND victory, the Irish again beat the Bruins and ended UCLA's NCAA record 88-game winning streak.
In 1977, the Irish upset previously undefeated #1-ranked University of San Francisco.
In 1980, the Irish upset previously undefeated #1-ranked DePaul.
In 1987, the Irish upset #1-ranked North Carolina 60-58.
In 1991, the Irish upset #2-ranked UCLA.
In 2005, the Irish ended Boston College's Big East record 20-game winning streak to start the season.
In 2011, the Irish ended a 21-game losing streak against the University of Tennessee Lady Volunteers. 
In 2012, the Irish upset previously undefeated #1-ranked Syracuse, 67-58.
In 2013, the Irish beat the Louisville Cardinals 104-101 in a 5-overtime game. Later that season, the Cardinals went on to win the NCAA Men's Basketball National Championship.
Notre Dame's most recent victory over a #1-ranked team in the Joyce Center came on February 6, 2016, when they defeated North Carolina 80-76 after trailing by 15 points.
In 2021, Notre Dame upset the #11 Florida State Seminoles in the Joyce Center 83-73, which ended their 28-game losing streak against Top 25 opponents. 
Later that same year, the Irish upset then-#10 Kentucky Wildcats 66–62.

See also
 List of NCAA Division I basketball arenas

References

External links 
 Joyce Center at UND.com

Basketball venues in Indiana
College basketball venues in the United States
Defunct college ice hockey venues in the United States
Ice hockey venues in Indiana
Notre Dame Fighting Irish basketball venues
Notre Dame Fighting Irish ice hockey
Notre Dame Fighting Irish women's volleyball
Sports venues in South Bend, Indiana
University of Notre Dame buildings and structures
Volleyball venues in Indiana
1968 establishments in Indiana
University and college buildings completed in 1968